Pahvische is a 2002 album by the Finnish group Eläkeläiset.

Track listing 
 "Kiitokset humpasta" (Kristian Voutilainen) – 3:24
 "Hanurissa Arja" (Onni Varis) – 2:56
 "Kuuma humppa" (Lassi Kinnunen) – 3:19
 "Humppanautinto" (Martti Varis) – 3:25
 "Jenkkapolkkahumppa" (Voutilainen) – 3:21
 "Päivätanssit" (Kinnunen) – 2:54
 "Humpataan, jumalauta" (O. Varis) – 2:02
 "Miksei täällä humppa soi?" (Voutilainen) – 3:52
 "Ranttalihumppa" (M. Varis) – 3:50
 "Sukellan humppaan" (O. Varis) – 3:22
 "Bingohon" (Kinnunen) – 3:24
 "Kiikkustuolissa" (Voutilainen) – 2:22
 "Humpalle vaan" (M. Varis) – 3:15
 "Humppastara" (Kinnunen) – 3:25
 "Humppauskonto" (Voutilainen) – 3:33

The CD also contains a 25-minute extra track, not listed on the cover, consisting of radio noise mixed with speech and fragments of songs.  Some sources list this final track with the name "Humppaviritys".

References 
The official home page of Eläkeläiset.  URL accessed on 25 June 2008.
Russian Eläkeläiset fanclub
Texts from this album

External links 
 Eläkeläiset covers, a list of which band and song each track on the album parodies.

2002 albums
Eläkeläiset albums